XNXX is a French website for sharing and viewing pornographic videos. As of November 2022, it was classified as the 14th most visited website in the world by Similarweb. It launched in 2000 and is currently hosted in Paris, with servers and offices in Montreal, Tokyo and Newark.

XNXX is owned by WGCZ Holding, the same company that runs XVideos, another popular pornographic website.

A Business Insider ranking from 2018 placed it in the three most popular porn sites worldwide.

History 

XNXX was founded in 1997. According to the website, the domain name was first copyrighted in 2000. It is unclear when WGCZ Holding acquired XNXX, as the website's ownership was unknown until WGCZ brought a Uniform Domain-Name Dispute-Resolution Policy case against a similar domain in 2014.

In 2018, the Government of India blocked XNXX, among other porn websites, after a Uttarakhand High Court court order demanding the same in a rape case where the perpetrators stated they were motivated to do so after watching online pornography.

Statistics and data 
As of 2018, XNXX was classified as the most visited porn site in Singapore and the fifth most visited porn site in India. As of April 2022, XNXX is the 24th most visited website in Switzerland and the 18th most visited website in Austria, though the majority of its users come from the United States, Egypt, and France. The bounce rate is around 20% and the average user spends around 12 minutes on the site.

See also 

 List of most visited websites
 Pornhub
 MindGeek

References

Further reading 

 
 
 

Erotica and pornography websites
Video hosting
Internet censorship in India